Seija-Riitta Laakso is a Finnish writer and philatelist, as well as editor of international philatelic journals and yearbooks. In 2021, she was invited to sign the Roll of Distinguished Philatelists.

Education
Seija-Riitta Laakso is a journalist from the Sanoma School of Journalism who also has an eMBA from the Helsinki School of Economics (Helsingin Kauppakorkeakoulu) and a PhD from the University of Helsinki (2006). Her doctoral thesis Across the Oceans. Development of Overseas Business Information Transmission, 1815-1875 was published by the Finnish Literature Society (SKS) in 2007, and as a Japanese edition in 2014. The book combines maritime history and postal history by studying the routes and speed at which information was transmitted in the nineteenth century, using as examples business correspondence which travelled internationally by sea.

Career
Laakso, originally a historian, worked as a journalist in Finnish daily newspapers Helsingin Sanomat, Uusi Suomi and Kauppalehti. She was director in the Centre for Finnish Business and Policy Studies (Elinkeinoelämän Valtuuskunta, EVA) and Senior Vice President / Vice President, Corporate Communications at Valmet Oyj, Silja Line Oyj and Ahlstrom Oyj, from 1991 to 2002. In 2003-2004 she lived in Liverpool, UK, for her doctoral studies. She has written and published several books.

Philately
Laakso was the Secretary General of the Philatelic Federation of Finland from 2005 to 2013. She is currently the Editor of The Posthorn, the journal of the Scandinavian Collectors Club (US); The Congress Book, the yearbook of the American Philatelic Congress (US); and Postryttaren, the yearbook of the Friends of the Swedish Post Museum, Svenska Postmusei Vänner. From July 2017 to December 2019, she was also the Editor of The London Philatelist, the journal of The Royal Philatelic Society London. As an exhibitor, she has received 36 gold or large gold medals in philatelic exhibitions by the end of 2020.

In 2021, she was invited to sign the Roll of Distinguished Philatelists.

Selected articles and publications

Finnish
Publications in Finnish include:
 ”Orjalaivoista Titaniciin – ihminen Lloyd’s Listin haaksirikkouutisissa”. Historiatieteellinen aikakauskirja Lähde Nro 1 2005, Teema: Moraali, pp. 115–131. Labyrintti ry, 2005.
 Postikorttien keräilystä kokoelman rakentamiseen. Helsinki, 2009.
 Paris 1900 - postikortteja kulta-ajan Pariisista. Helsinki, 2010.
 Kinoman tyttö. Riga, 2014.
 Merkillisiä tapahtumia - Collector Events. Riga, 2014.
 Torilla tavataan - See you at the Square, Riga, 2014.
 Glamouria Suomessa - amerikkalaistaiteilijoiden suomalaiset postikortit 1910- ja 1920-luvuilla. Helsinki 2020.

English
 "Managing the Distance: Business Information Transmission between Britain and Guiana, 1840", International Journal of Maritime History, Vol. 16, No. 2 (December 2004), pp. 221–246.
 “In Search of Information Flows – Postal Historical Methods in Historical Research". Müller & Ojala (ed.): Information Flows. New Approaches in the Historical Study of Business Information, pp. 84–102. SKS, 2007. 
Across the Oceans. Development of Overseas Business Information Transmission 1815-1875. The Finnish Literature Society (SKS), Studia Fennica Historica, 2007. The Japanese edition was published in Japan 2014.
 Collecting & exhibiting picture postcards. Livonia Print, Riga, 2012. 
 "A secret revealed after 110 years - Albert Edelfelt's 'Cabaret de Montmartre, Paris'", The London Philatelist Jan-Feb 2018, pp. 16–30.
 "Glamour in Finland - American Beauties on Finnish Picture Postcards, 1915-1923", The Congress Book 2020, pp. 154-200. American Philatelic Congress, August 2020.

References

External links 
 https://www.linkedin.com/in/seija-riitta-laakso-34085824/

Living people
Finnish philatelists
Finnish journalists
Finnish editors
Women philatelists
University of Helsinki alumni
21st-century Finnish historians
Finnish non-fiction writers
Finnish women non-fiction writers
Year of birth missing (living people)
Finnish women historians
Finnish women journalists
Finnish women editors
Signatories to the Roll of Distinguished Philatelists